Dave Dye  (born January 8, 1945) is a former American football coach.  Dye was the head football coach at Hillsdale College  in Hillsdale, Michigan.  He held that position for five seasons, from 1997 until 2001.  His coaching record at Hillsdale was 21–34.

References

1945 births
Living people
Hillsdale Chargers football coaches
Baldwin Wallace University alumni